James was a 48-gun second rank ship of the line of the English Royal Navy, built by Phineas Pett II at Deptford Dockyard and launched in 1634.

In 1660, at the Restoration of the English monarchy, the 70-gun Richard was renamed  and James became known as Old James; her armament had by this time been increased to 60 guns.

Old James was sold out of the navy in 1682.

Notes

References

Lavery, Brian (2003) The Ship of the Line - Volume 1: The development of the battlefleet 1650-1850. Conway Maritime Press. .

Ships of the line of the Royal Navy
Ships built in Deptford
1630s ships